The Church of Santa María de Sabada is a Roman Catholic church in the municipality of Llastres, Asturias, Spain. 

Maria de Sabada
Bien de Interés Cultural landmarks in Asturias